Darío Esteban Osorio Osorio (born 24 January 2004) is a Chilean professional footballer who plays as a midfielder for Chilean Primera División side Universidad de Chile and the Chile national team.

Club career
As a child, Osorio was with Santiago Wanderers and Escuela Municipal Hijuelas, but in 2015 he joined Universidad de Chile after a training test in El Melón being recommended by Rubén Farfán who played for the first team. In 2021, he was called up to the first team but he made his professional debut in a 2022 Summer International Tournament played in Argentina, scoring a goal in the match against Colo-Colo.

International career
Osorio has been frequently called up for Chile at under-17 and under-20 levels. In December 2021, he represented Chile U20 at the friendly tournament Rául Coloma Rivas, playing three matches and scoring a goal against Paraguay U20. In July 2022, he scored twice in a friendly match versus Peru U20. In September 2022, he made an appearance in the Costa Cálida Supercup. In 2023, he made four appearances in the South American U-20 Championship.

He represented Chile at under-23 level in a 1–0 win against Peru U23 on 31 August 2022, in the context of preparations for the 2023 Pan American Games.

At senior level, he made his debut in the 2022 Kirin Cup Soccer match against Tunisia on 10 June 2022.

References

External links
 
 Darío Osorio at playmakerstats.com (English version of ceroacero.es)

2004 births
Living people
People from Quillota Province
Chilean footballers
Chile international footballers
Chile youth international footballers
Chile under-20 international footballers
Association football forwards
Universidad de Chile footballers
Chilean Primera División players
21st-century Chilean people